Red Youth (abbr. RU) is a Norwegian youth organisation. It is the youth wing of the Red Party, which was formed from a merger of the Red Electoral Alliance and the Workers' Communist Party in March 2007. The current leader of Red Youth is Alberte Tennøe Bekkhus.

Politics
It is an organisation with three main principles: revolutionary socialism, feminism, and communism. Their goals are typically communist; they aim to organise the working class in preparation for what they perceive as an eventual overthrow of the capitalist system.

Since the election of the Red-Green government in 2005, Red Youth has been working to push the Labour Party and the Socialist Left Party in a communist direction. In August 2008, a faction of communist dissidents left the youth organization to form Revolutionary Communist Youth, the youth affiliate of Serve the People.

Activism

Red Youth is an activist organisation, and has performed political actions and media stunts directed towards Norwegian politicians. Red Youth interrupted the Christian Democratic Party's national meeting in 2004 in an attempt to expose and highlight what they perceived as the Christian Democrats' anti-homosexual attitude. Also in 2004, they harassed the Conservative Minister of Education, Kristin Clemet, for alleged crimes against Norwegian students.

Several members of the Red Youth were arrested in 2005, after trying to charge the Parliament of Norway in what was an anti-racist action. The Red Youth also built a refugee asylum in the garden of the Conservative Minister of Local Government, Erna Solberg, in 2008, as a protest against her immigration policies. They have also drilled for oil in Finance Minister Kristin Halvorsen's garden as a protest against oil drilling in the northern parts of Norway. In 2010, the Red Youth launched a campaign to collect 100,000 NOK to offer Siv Jensen, party leader of the Progress Party, to leave the country in response to her own party's proposal to offer immigrants the same sum to go back to their own countries.

References

External links
 
 Political platform

1963 establishments in Norway
Anti-racism in Norway
Far-left politics in Norway
Organisations based in Oslo
Red Party (Norway)
Youth organizations established in 1963
Youth wings of communist parties
Youth wings of political parties in Norway